Steve Gould may refer to:

Steve Gould (musician) (born 1950), British musician with the bands Rare Bird and Runner
Steve Gould (curler) (born 1972), Canadian curler

See also
Stephen Jay Gould (1941–2002), American paleontologist, evolutionary biologist, and historian of science
Steven Gould (born 1955), American science fiction author